Donald Stewart (May 14, 1910  March 1, 1966) was an American actor and singer, who settled and worked in the United Kingdom. After training at the American Academy of Dramatic Arts and several appearances in Broadway musicals (including Life Begins at 8:40), Stewart moved to Britain. He performed in revue, and became a leading man in several British films of the 1940s including The Peterville Diamond (1942) and One Exciting Night (1944). During the 1950s he appeared in character roles in films and increasingly on television. He was married to the actress Renée Houston, whom he met filming Fine Feathers (1937).

Selected filmography
 Soft Lights and Sweet Music (1936)
 Flying Fortress (1942)
 The Peterville Diamond (1942)
 One Exciting Night (1944)
 Welcome, Mr. Washington (1944)
 I'll Get You for This (1951)
 Reluctant Bride (1955)
 Tiger by the Tail (1955)
 The Sheriff of Fractured Jaw (1958)

References

Bibliography
 Goble, Alan. The Complete Index to Literary Sources in Film. Walter de Gruyter, 1999.

External links

1910 births
1966 deaths
American male television actors
American male stage actors
American male film actors
English singers
English male television actors
English male stage actors
English male film actors
American emigrants to England
Actors from Wilkes-Barre, Pennsylvania
20th-century American male actors
20th-century English male actors
20th-century American singers
20th-century English singers
20th-century American male singers